The 1897 Guilford Quakers football team represented Guilford College as an independent during the 1897 college football season.

Schedule

References

Guilford
Guilford Quakers football seasons
Guilford Quakers football